Anthony Roth Costanzo is an American countertenor, actor, and producer who has led performances at opera companies around the world. Beginning his career in musical theatre at the age of 11, he has since been featured at the Metropolitan Opera, Lyric Opera of Chicago, San Francisco Opera, English National Opera, Los Angeles Opera, and Glyndebourne Opera Festival, as well as in concert with the New York Philharmonic, Berlin Philharmonic, San Francisco Symphony, London Symphony Orchestra, Cleveland Orchestra, and National Symphony Orchestra. In 2012, he won first place at Plácido Domingo's international opera competition Operalia and, in 2009, was a Grand Finals Winner of the Metropolitan Opera National Council Auditions. As an actor, he has performed in several films, including the Merchant Ivory film A Soldier's Daughter Never Cries, for which he was nominated for an Independent Spirit Award.   As a producer and curator, he has created shows for National Sawdust, Opera Philadelphia, the Philharmonia Baroque, Princeton University, WQXR, The State Theater in Salzburg, MasterVoices, and Kabuki-za Tokyo. Costanzo is a graduate of Princeton University, where he has returned to teach, and he received his master's degree from the Manhattan School of Music.

Early life 
Costanzo grew up in Durham, North Carolina. Both of Costanzo's parents were professors of psychology at Duke University.

Costanzo became active in the arts at a young age. He performed on Broadway and in Broadway national tours including A Christmas Carol, The Sound of Music, and Falsettos. He sang backup for Michael Jackson and the Olsen Twins, as well as a duet with Deborah Gibson. He began his opera career while still a teenager, performing the role Miles in The Turn of the Screw. Costanzo also performed with Luciano Pavarotti in the Opera Extravaganza production by the Academy of Music in Philadelphia.

Education
Costanzo graduated magna cum laude and Phi Beta Kappa from Princeton University in 2004 with a degree in music. He was awarded the Lewis Sudler prize in the arts. Costanzo frequently returns to Princeton to teach courses and master classes. After Princeton, Costanzo attended the Manhattan School of Music, where he received his Masters of Music and earned the Hugh Ross Award.

Career

Opera 
Costanzo has appeared in numerous roles at the Metropolitan Opera. He has appeared as both Ferdinand and Prospero in the world premiere of The Enchanted Island. He also performed as Prince Orlofsky in a production of Die Fledermaus after making his debut as Unulfo in Rodelinda.

Costanzo has appeared in many venues throughout North America. He performed the title role in Philip Glass' Akhnaten at the English National Opera, the Los Angeles Opera, and again at The Metropolitan Opera in November and December 2019. He has also appeared with the San Francisco Opera, Lyric Opera of Chicago, Houston Grand Opera, Dallas Opera, Glimmerglass Festival, Opera Philadelphia, San Diego Opera, Boston Lyric Opera, Michigan Opera Theater, Palm Beach Opera, The North Carolina Opera, Cincinnati Opera, and as a guest with Juilliard Opera.

Internationally, Costanzo made his European debut at the Glyndebourne Festival in Rinaldo and later performed with the Canadian Opera Company. Costanzo appeared at the Teatro Real Madrid in Death in Venice in 2014, the English National Opera in The Indian Queen in 2015 and the Finnish National Opera in Kaija Sariaaho's Only the Sound Remains in 2017.

A champion of new works, Costanzo has created roles in Jimmy López's Bel Canto at the Lyric Opera of Chicago and Jake Heggie's Great Scott at Dallas Opera. He has also premiered works written for him by Matthew Aucoin, Paola Prestini, Gregory Spears, Suzanne Farrin, Bernard Rands, Scott Wheeler, Mohammed Fairouz, Steve Mackey, and Nico Muhly.

Concert 
In 2018 Costanzo made his concert debuts with the London Symphony Orchestra and the Berlin Philharmonic in performances of György Ligeti's Le Grand Macabre, conducted by Sir Simon Rattle and directed by Peter Sellars. He sang Messiah at Carnegie Hall in 2009. Costanzo appeared in the New York Philharmonic's production of Le Grand Macabre in 2010.  Costanzo performed Handel's Messiah, Bernstein's Chichester Psalms and Orff's Carmina Burana with The Cleveland Orchestra.

Costanzo has also appeared in concert with the International Contemporary Ensemble (ICE) at both the Mostly Mozart Festival and the Metropolitan Museum of Art. Costanzo has also performed with Jordi Savall in Barcelona, Paris, and Versailles, with Ian Bostridge and Julius Drake at the Teatro Real, and the Spoleto Festival USA. He has also appeared with the San Francisco Symphony, the National Symphony Orchestra, Trinity Church Wall Street, and the orchestras of Indianapolis, Detroit, Denver, Birmingham (Alabama), and Seattle.

Collaboration 
Costanzo is passionate about interdisciplinary collaboration, and in 2018 created an art installation with multimedia fashion and art company Visionaire, producer Cath Brittan, artist George Condo, fashion designer Raf Simons (Chief Creative Officer of Calvin Klein), choreographer Justin Peck, dancers David Hallberg and Patricia Delgado, and other artists including James Ivory, Pix Talarico, Maurizio Catellan, Pierpaolo Ferrari, Mark Romanek, Mickalene Thomas, Daniel Askill, AES+F, and Chen Tianzhuo. He recently helped create two unique collaborations with Kabuki and Noh actors in a presentation of The Tale of Genji, with sold-out runs in Tokyo and Kyoto. His has curated and produced two sold-out runs of performances for National Sawdust including Aci, Galatea e Polifemo,  and Orphic Moments which traveled to the Salzburger Landestheater, and then Lincoln Center's Rose Theater with MasterVoices. At Princeton, Costanzo also created a pasticcio about castrati in collaboration with choreographer Karole Armitage and filmmaker James Ivory, which was chronicled by the documentarian Gerardo Puglia. The film was selected for the Cannes Film Festival and qualified for an Academy Award, airing on PBS affiliates.

In New York City, he has appeared in venues such as The Park Avenue Armory, Joe's Pub, The Guggenheim Museum, Le Poisson Rouge, Subculture, The Box Soho, Morgan Library & Museum, The Metropolitan Museum of Art, The Miller Theater, The New York Public Library, and Madison Square Garden.

Costanzo was nominated for an Independent Spirit Award for his role of Francis in the Merchant Ivory film, A Soldier's Daughter Never Cries. He also played Simon in Brice Cauvin's film De Particulier a Particulier and portrayed Allen Ginsberg in the short film Starving Hysterical Naked.

Constanza collaborated with cabaret artist Justin Vivian Bond on their show "Only An Octave Apart," which premiered at St. Ann's Warehouse in Brooklyn and went to London in the fall of 2022. They released an album of music by the same name.

Personal life
Costanzo is gay. He participated in the pride month event hosted by the Metropolitan Opera.

Major performances

Opera
 Metropolitan Opera (Rodelinda, Die Fledermaus, The Enchanted Island, Akhnaten)
 Lyric Opera of Chicago (Bel Canto – world premiere)
 San Francisco Opera (Partenope)
 English National Opera (Akhnaten, The Indian Queen)
 Los Angeles Opera (Akhnaten)
 Glyndebourne Opera Festival (Rinaldo)
 Houston Grand Opera (Giulio Cesare)
 Teatro Real Madrid (Death in Venice)
 Philadelphia Opera (Written on Skin, Phaedra)
 Canadian Opera Company (Semele)
 White Light Festival – Lincoln Center (Stabat Mater)
 Glimmerglass Opera (Tolomeo, Stabat Mater, Dido and Aeneas, and Giulio Cesare)
 Cincinnati Opera (L'Incoronazione di Poppea)
 Dallas Opera (Great Scott – world premiere)
 Spoleto Festival USA (Farnace, Dido and Aeneas)
 Finnish National Opera (Only the Sound Remains)
 Florida Grand Opera (Orfeo) 
 Boston Lyric Opera (Agrippina)
 San Diego Opera (Great Scott)
 Palm Beach Opera (Orfeo)
 Michigan Opera Theater (Giulio Cesare)
 New York City Opera (Partenope)
 Juilliard Opera (Ariodante)
 Manhattan School of Music (Griffelkin) 
 Seattle Opera Young Artists Program (A Midsummer Night's Dream)
 Santa Fe Opera (The Lord of Cries)

Orchestra
 New York Philharmonic (Le Grand Macabre)
 Cleveland Orchestra (Messiah)
 National Symphony Orchestra (Messiah)
 London Symphony Orchestra (Le Grand Macabre)
 Berlin Philharmonic (Le Grand Macabre)
 Tours in Spain and France with Jordi Savall and his ensemble

Awards

Leadership roles 
 Board of Trustees, Manhattan School of Music
 Advisory Council, Department of Music, Princeton University
 Artistic Advisory Council, National Sawdust
 Artistic Advisory Board, The Glimmerglass Festival
 Artistic Advisory Board, Brooklyn Youth Chorus
 Board of Directors, American Opera Projects
 Advisory Board, Brooklyn Music School
 Advisor to the Board, Jonah Bokaer Arts Foundation

References

External links 
 Official website
 

Operatic countertenors
Living people
American opera singers
21st-century American opera singers
Singers from North Carolina
Musicians from Durham, North Carolina
1982 births
21st-century American male singers
21st-century American singers
American LGBT singers
21st-century American LGBT people